Breslau was the name given to a wolfpack of German U-boats that operated during the World War II Battle of the Atlantic in 1943 from 2 October 1941 to 29 October 1941.

Breslau
The group was responsible for sinking 7 merchant ships, 2 warships (2,795 tons) and 1 warship damaged (6,746 tons).

Raiding History

U-boats

References

Wolfpacks of 1941
Wolfpack Breslau